Afrasura numida is a moth of the subfamily Arctiinae first described by William Jacob Holland in 1893. It is found in Cameroon, the Democratic Republic of the Congo, Gabon, Ghana and Nigeria.

References

Moths described in 1893
numida
Moths of Africa
Insects of Cameroon
Insects of West Africa
Fauna of Gabon